Student Politics in Pakistan: A Celebration, Lament & History is a detailed paper written by journalist and former student activist, Nadeem F. Paracha. The work covers the history of student politics in Pakistan from 1947 till 2000, and was published to mark the restoration of student politics and unions in Pakistan by the new government led by Prime Minister Yusuf Raza Gillani.

Student politics in Pakistan